Glassford railway station served the village of Glassford, South Lanarkshire, Scotland, from 1863 to 1953 on the Hamilton and Strathaven Railway.

History 
The station was opened on 2 February 1863 by the Hamilton and Strathaven Railway. To the east was the goods yard and nearby was the signal box, which was built in 1891 and closed on 1906, being replaced by a ground frame. Its name appeared in Bradshaw as Glassford Halt in 1933 but it was corrected to Glassford in 1937. The station closed to passengers on 1 October 1945 and closed to goods on 21 September 1953.

References 

Disused railway stations in South Lanarkshire
Railway stations in Great Britain opened in 1863
Railway stations in Great Britain closed in 1945
1863 establishments in Scotland
1953 disestablishments in Scotland